The Outlet Shoppes of the Bluegrass is a   outlet mall located near Interstate 64 in Simpsonville, Kentucky. The mall opened on July 31, 2014. Anchor stores include Old Navy, Nike, Polo Ralph Lauren, Tommy Hilfiger, and American Eagle Outfitters.

At its opening, it was one of seven outlet malls in the United States to have Italian clothing retailer Gucci as a tenant.

References
The Outlet Shoppes of the Bluegrass is Kentucky’s only designer outlet shopping center. Located on I-64| ext. 28 in Simpsonville, Kentucky, just 10 minutes from Louisville. 80+ stores including Tory Burch, Michael Kors, Kate Spade, The North Face, Under Armour, Nike, Polo Ralph Lauren, and American Eagle Outfitters.

External links

Interactive Mall Map

Shopping malls in Kentucky
CBL Properties
Shopping malls established in 2014
Outlet malls in the United States
Tourist attractions in Shelby County, Kentucky
Buildings and structures in Shelby County, Kentucky